Sington is a surname. Notable people with the surname include:

David Sington, British director, producer, screenwriter and author
Fred Sington (1910–1998), American football and baseball player
H. S. Sington (1878–1956), British physician and anaesthetist
Philip Sington (born 1962), British novelist and playwright